Gunnar Larsson (politician)  (1908-1996) was a Swedish politician. He was a member of the Centre Party.

References
This article was initially translated from the Swedish Wikipedia article.

Centre Party (Sweden) politicians
1908 births
Year of death missing